Lorenzo Alexis Bromell (born September 23, 1975 in Georgetown, South Carolina) is a former NFL defensive end. Bromell began his professional career with the Miami Dolphins and played for the Minnesota Vikings, Oakland Raiders and New York Giants. During his career, Bromell compiled 27.5 sacks. He is best remembered for breaking Peyton Manning's jaw during a game in 2001.

Bromell attended Clemson University.

References

 Lorenzo Bromell statistics

1975 births
Living people
People from Georgetown, South Carolina
American football defensive ends
Clemson Tigers football players
Miami Dolphins players
Minnesota Vikings players
Oakland Raiders players
New York Giants players